Stegea eripalis is a moth in the family Crambidae. It was described by Augustus Radcliffe Grote in 1878. It is found in North America, where it has been recorded from Alabama, Arkansas, Florida, Illinois, Indiana, Maryland, Mississippi, Ohio, Oklahoma, Ontario, South Carolina, Tennessee and Texas.

References

Moths described in 1878
Glaphyriinae